Orentius was one of the Seven Brothers of Lazia, which included Cyriacus, Firminus, Firmus, Heros, Longinus, and Pharnacius. They were all soldiers in the Roman Army, who lost their positions for being Christians. They all suffered martyrdom, during the persecutions of co-Emperor Maximian.

References

304 deaths
Italian saints
4th-century Christian martyrs
4th-century Romans
Year of birth unknown
Groups of Christian martyrs of the Roman era
Military saints